Fakhri Mohammed Salman (born 1 July 1935) is a former Iraqi football forward who played for Iraq in the 1957 Pan Arab Games.  He scored a goal against Libya.

Career statistics

International goals
Scores and results list Iraq's goal tally first.

References

Iraqi footballers
Iraq international footballers
Association football forwards
1935 births
Living people